Bradley LeCroy (born 1979) is an American baseball coach who currently coaches the VCU Rams baseball program. Prior to VCU, he served as a long-time assistant coach at Clemson University as well as an assistant coach at the University of Tennessee and Western Carolina University.

Career 
LeCroy played college baseball with Clemson as a shortstop from 1997 through 2000, and was part of the 2000 team that advanced to the College World Series. After graduating from Clemson, LeCroy served as an assistant coach at Anderson University. LeCroy subsequently returned to Clemson to serve as a volunteer assistant coach from 2003 until 2005, before serving as an assistant at Western Carolina and then Tennessee through 2010. Ahead of the 2011 NCAA Division I baseball season, LeCroy returned to Clemson as an assistant coach where he served part of the staff through 2022.

On August 4, 2022, LeCroy was announced as the head coach for VCU's baseball team to replace the outgoing Shawn Stiffler.

Heading coaching record

References

External links 
 Bradley LeCroy at Clemson University Athletics

1979 births
Living people
Baseball shortstops
Anderson Trojans baseball coaches
Clemson Tigers baseball players
Clemson Tigers baseball coaches
Tennessee Volunteers baseball coaches
VCU Rams baseball coaches
Western Carolina Catamounts baseball coaches